Hebius khasiensis, commonly known as the Khasi Hills keelback or Khasi keelback,  is a species of colubrid snake endemic to southeastern Asia.

Geographic range
It is found in parts of southern China (Tibet, Yunnan), eastern India (Assam), Thailand, Laos, Myanmar, Cambodia, and Vietnam.

Description
It is a reddish-brown snake with a white transverse bar running across the supralabial scales.

The dorsal scales are in 19 rows, rather strongly keeled, except for the smooth outer row. The ventrals number 150-154, the subcaudals 80–100. The anal plate is divided.

Adults are about 60 cm (23½ in.) total length, of which about 19 cm (7½ in.) is tail.

Diet
The Khasi Hills keelback's nutritional intake consists primarily of toads.

Photos

References

Further reading
 Boulenger, G.A. 1890. The Fauna of British India, Including Ceylon and Burma. Reptilia and Batrachia. Secretary of State for India in Council.  (Taylor & Francis, Printers). London. xviii + 541 pp. (Tropidonotus khasiensis, p. 344.)

khasiense
Reptiles of Myanmar
Reptiles of Cambodia
Reptiles of China
Reptiles of India
Reptiles of Laos
Reptiles of Thailand
Reptiles of Vietnam
Reptiles described in 1890
Taxa named by George Albert Boulenger
Snakes of China
Snakes of Vietnam
Snakes of Asia